Thomas Alexander Douglas (11 September 1910 – 6 March 1943) was a Scottish professional association footballer who played as an inside forward.

Personal life
Douglas served as a sapper in the Royal Engineers during the Second World War and died on active service in French Algeria on 6 March 1943. He is buried at El Alia Cemetery.

References

1910 births
1943 deaths
Footballers from Ayr
Scottish footballers
Association football forwards
Blackpool F.C. players
Burnley F.C. players
Witton Albion F.C. players
Rochdale A.F.C. players
English Football League players
Royal Engineers soldiers
Scottish military personnel
British Army personnel killed in World War II